Bruno Bischofberger (born 1940) is a Swiss art dealer and collector.

Life 
Bischofberger was born in 1940 in Zürich. He studied art history, archaeology and ethnography (folk art) at the University of Zurich, with further studies at the universities of Bonn and Munich. Bischofberger has three daughters and a son and lives near Zurich with his wife Christina, known as Yoyo, in a house designed by Ettore Sottsass overlooking Lake Zurich.

Gallery 
Bischofberger opened his first gallery in 1963 on Pelikanstrasse in Zurich, then under the name City-Galerie. In 1965, he hosted his first exhibition of Pop Art at the gallery with works by Roy Lichtenstein, Robert Rauschenberg, Andy Warhol, Tom Wesselmann, Claes Oldenburg and Jasper Johns. In the 1970s, Bischofberger continued to showcase American Pop Art along with proponents of Minimalism, Land Art and Conceptual Art, such as Sol Le Witt, Donald Judd, Dan Flavin, Bruce Nauman, Joseph Kosuth and On Kawara, and representatives of Nouveau Réalisme in Paris, such as Yves Klein, Daniel Spoerri and Jean Tinguely. Between 1982 and 2005, a three-volume catalogue raisonné of Jean Tinguely's oeuvre was published by Bischofberger's wife Christina. In the 1980s, Bischofberger championed key figures of the nascent Neo-Expressionist movements, such as Miquel Barceló, Jean-Michel Basquiat, Mike Bidlo, George Condo, Francesco Clemente, Enzo Cucchi, Dokoupil, Peter Halley, David Salle and Julian Schnabel.

In 2009 and 2010, Bischofberger's artists from the 1980s were shown at the Bielefeld Kunsthalle in a pair of exhibitions entitled The 80s Revisited – From the Bischofberger Collection I & II. The presentations also included exponents of the Neue Wilde (New Wild Ones) from Berlin, such as Rainer Fetting or Salomé, and the Mülheimer Freiheit around Walter Dahn and Dokoupil.  Bischofberger has typically maintained close personal relationships with his artists, many of which endure to this day.

In 2013, the gallery relocated from Zurich to the grounds of a former factory in the nearby community of Männedorf, where since 2005 Bischofberger has been erecting numerous buildings designed by his daughter Nina Bischofberger and her husband Florian Baier. The complex contains the gallery spaces, exhibition and storage areas for the artworks as well as objects from various collections. Since the 1980s, Bischofberger has promoted his exhibitions on the back cover of periodicals such as Artforum and Kunstbulletin. Instead of showing works from the respective exhibitions, the advertisements have featured photographic scenes of traditional Swiss life. In 2018 the artist Peter Fischli joined with Hilar Stadler, curator of the Museum im Bellpark in Kriens, to stage an exhibition dedicated to these back covers.

Warhol and Basquiat 

Bischofberger is especially well known for his close association with Andy Warhol and Jean-Michel Basquiat. He encountered Warhol for the first time in New York in 1966. During a subsequent meeting in 1968, Warhol showed him a number of early unpublished works. Bischofberger was able to select eleven very significant works, including some hand-painted early pieces such as Superman, Batman, a coloured Coca-Cola painting and several large, often double-panelled Disaster paintings and early portraits dating from 1961 to 1963. Warhol granted Bischofberger the right of first refusal on any future art works, a commitment that endured until Warhol's death in 1987. Bischofberger travelled several times a year to New York City. In 1970, Warhol painted a portrait of Bischofberger. The latter subsequently proposed a pricing scheme for commissioned portraits with standardized dimensions for clients of the gallery, which would become Warhol's main source of income over the next few years. Bischofberger came across Basquiat's work for the first time in 1981 and one year later became his main art dealer worldwide until the artist's death in 1988. In addition, Bischofberger was responsible for introducing Warhol and Basquiat and later encouraging their collaborations with Francesco Clemente.

Warhol and Basquiat continued to collaborate, with the younger artist persuading Warhol to paint by hand again after having worked exclusively with silk screens for 23 years. Bischofberger had the idea for the artistic collaborations after Basquiat made several drawings together with Bischofberger's then three-year-old daughter Cora on a visit to Switzerland. In 1969, Bischofberger founded Interview Magazine together with Warhol. In Julian Schnabel's 1996 film Basquiat, Bruno Bischofberger was played by Dennis Hopper.

Publications 
 “Andy Warhol's Visual Memory" in: Bruno Bischofberger, Andy Warhol's Visual Memory, Edition Galerie Bruno Bischofberger, Zurich, 2001, pp. 9ff.; (in German) Carl Haenlein (ed.), Andy Warhol Fotografien 1976–1987, Kestnergesellschaft, Hannover, 2001, pp. 13ff.
 “A Brief History of My Relationship with Andy Warhol", in: (expanded version for foreword) Bruno Bischofberger, Andy Warhol's Visual Memory, Edition, Galerie Bruno Bischofberger, Zurich, 2001, pp. 6–7; Magnus Bischofberger, Prehistory to the Future: Highlights from the Bischofberger Collection, Electa, Milan, 2008, pp. 258–259
 "Collaborations: Reflections on the Experiences with Basquiat, Clemente and Warhol", in: (edited version) Magnus Bischofberger, Prehistory to the Future: Highlights from the Bischofberger Collection, Electa, Milan, 2008, pp. 262ff.; (unedited version) Tilman Osterwold (ed.), Collaborations: Warhol, Basquiat Clemente, Cantz, Ostfildern-Ruit, 1996, pp. 39ff.

References

External links
 Gallerie Bruno Bischofberger, Zürich and St. Moritz.

Swiss art dealers
1940 births
Living people
Place of birth missing (living people)
Contemporary art galleries in Switzerland